The 2015 Nagoya Grampus season is Nagoya Grampus' 23rd season in the J.League Division 1 and 33rd overall in the Japanese top flight. It is Akira Nishino's second season as manager.

Squad

Out on loan

Transfers

Winter

In:

Out:

Summer

In:

Out:

Competitions

J.League

First stage

Results summary

Results by round

Results

League table

Second stage

Results summary

Results by round

Results

League table

Overall

J.League Cup

Group stage

Knockout stage

Emperor's Cup

Squad statistics

Appearances and goals

|-
|colspan="14"|Players who left Nagoya Grampus on loan during the season:

|-
|colspan="14"|Players who left Nagoya Grampus during the season:

Goal Scorers

Disciplinary record

References

Nagoya Grampus
Nagoya Grampus seasons